The 2012–13 Monmouth Hawks men's basketball team represented Monmouth University during the 2012–13 NCAA Division I men's basketball season. The Hawks, led by second year head coach King Rice, played their home games at the Multipurpose Activity Center and were members of the Northeast Conference. They finished the season 10–21, 5–13 in NEC play to finish in a tie for tenth place. They failed to qualify for the Northeast Conference Basketball tournament.

This was the Hawks last year as a member of the NEC as they joined the Metro Atlantic Athletic Conference for the 2013–14 season.

Roster

Schedule

|-
!colspan=9| Regular season

References

Monmouth Hawks men's basketball seasons
Monmouth